Aszure Barton is a Canadian-born choreographer.

Career 
Aszure Barton was born and raised in Alberta, Canada. She received her formal training at the National Ballet School in Toronto, where, as a student, she helped originate the ongoing Stephen Godfrey Choreographic Showcase. To date, she has collaborated with and created works for Mikhail Baryshnikov, Ekaterina Shipulina/Bolshoi Ballet, The National Ballet of Canada, Houston Ballet, American Ballet Theatre, The Martha Graham Dance Company, Nederlands Dans Theater, Sydney Dance Company, Ballet British Columbia, Hubbard Street Dance Chicago, The Juilliard School, Les Ballets Jazz de Montréal (Resident Choreographer 2005-08) and English National Ballet. Other work includes choreography for the Broadway revival production of The Threepenny Opera. Her work has been described as "offer[ing] an entire world, full of surprise and humor, emotion and pain, expressed through a dance vocabulary that takes ballet technique and dismantles it to near-invisibility" by the New York Times. 

She is the founder and director of Aszure Barton & Artists, an international dance project, and her works continue to tour to Europe, Asia, and Africa as well as Argentina, Brazil, Canada, and the United States. She has been an artist in residence at The Baryshnikov Arts Center.

In its review of a 2011 performance, The Buffalo News says that Barton and her company "let flow wave after wave of idiosyncratic movement that vacillated from elegantly graceful to stylized clowning and the outright bizarre."

References

External links 
 Aszure and Artists dance company
 Archival footage of Aszure & Artists performing Lascilo Perdere in 2005 at Jacob's Pillow
 Archival footage of Hubbard Street Dance Chicago performing Aszure Barton's Untouched in 2010 at Jacob's Pillow

Canadian choreographers
Living people
Year of birth missing (living people)
People from Alberta
Canadian women choreographers